S.S.P. Reyer Venezia Mestre, commonly known as Reyer Venezia or simply Reyer, is an Italian professional basketball club that is based in Venice, Veneto. The club currently plays in the Lega Basket Serie A (LBA), the highest tier of basketball in Italy, as well as the EuroCup. Reyer operates both men's and women's professional teams, both playing in their respective first divisions as of the 2017–18 season. The men's team has been crowned the Italian champions four times, as they won the LBA in 1942, 1943, 2017 and 2019.

History

The team was founded in 1872 as gymnastics club Società Sportiva Costantino Reyer, by the gymnastics teacher Peter Gallo in Venice. The basketball section was founded in 1925. In the 1941–42 and 1942–43 season, Reyer won back-to-back Italian league titles. In 1944, the team also won the Italian championship, but the victory was not approved by the Italian Federation.

The club, under the name Carrera Venezia, participated in the 1980–81 FIBA Korać Cup and managed to reach the final where the club was defeated 104–105 by Joventut Freixenet that took place in Palau Blaugrana, Barcelona at March 19.

In 2006–07, Reyer was the amateur champion of Italy, and promoted to the LegaDue. In the 2010–11 season, the team finally promoted back to the Lega Basket Serie A.

In the 2016–17 season, Reyer reached the LBA Finals for the first time since 1944. Reyer claimed its third national championship on June 20, 2017, after beating Trento 4–2 in the series. Reyer also played in the Basketball Champions League that season and advanced to the Final Four, where the team finished in fourth place.

In the 2017–18 season, coming off of its national championship, Venezia participated in its second straight Champions League season. In Group C, Reyer finished in the sixth-place after holding an 8–6 record. The team was transferred to the FIBA Europe Cup for the play-offs, where it beat Egis Körmend, Nizhny Novgorod and Donar in order to reach the Finals. In the Finals, Reyer faced fellow Italian side Sidigas Avellino. Reyer won the finals 158–148 on aggregate, and on 2 May 2018 the club won the FIBA Europe Cup, its first ever European trophy.

On June 22, 2019, Umana Reyer Venezia won their 4th Italian league title by beating Banco di Sardegna Sassari in game 7 of the LBA finals.

On February 16, 2020, Venezia went to win its first Italian Cup ever by beating Happy Casa Brindisi 73–67 in the Finals in the Adriatic Arena of Pesaro.

Honours
Total titles: 4

Domestic competitions
 Italian League
 Winners (4): 1941–42, 1942–43, 2016–17, 2018–19
 Runners-up (1): 1945–46
 Italian Cup
 Winners (1): 2019–20
 Italian Supercup
 Runners-up (2): 2017, 2019

European competitions
 FIBA Korać Cup (defunct)
 Runners-up (1): 1980–81
 FIBA Europe Cup
 Winners (1): 2017–18

Players

Current roster

Depth chart

Notable players

Season by season

Source: Eurobasket.com

Head coaches

    
 1940–1946:  Vidal Carmelo
 1948–1951:  Amerigo Penzo
 1951–1953:  Enrico Garbosi
 1953–1955:  Egidio Marsico
 1955–1956:  Enrico Garbosi
 1956–1957:  Giulio Geroli
 1958–1959:  Egidio Marsico
 1959–1960:  Giulio Geroli
 1964–1971:  Giulio Geroli
 1971–1979:  Tonino Zorzi
 1979–1980:  Giuseppe Guerrieri
 1980–1981:  Tonino Zorzi
 1981–1982:  Waldi Medeot
 1982–1983:  Aca Nikolić
 1983–1985:  Waldi Medeot
 1985–1987:  Tonino Zorzi
 1987–1988:  Petar Skansi
 1988–1990:  Marco Calamai
 1990–1991:   Andy Russo
 1991–1993:  Mario De Sisti
    
 1993–1996:  Francesco Vitucci
 1997–2006:  Costantini Sales e Rubini
 2008:  Eugenio Dalmasson
 2008:  Stefano Bizzozi
 2009:  Sandro Dell'Agnello
 2009–2013:  Andrea Mazzon
 2013–2014:   Zare Markovski
 2014–2016:  Carlo Recalcati
 2016–2023:  Walter De Raffaele
 2023–present:  Neven Spahija

Sponsorship names
Throughout the years, due to sponsorship, the club has been known as :

Noalex Venezia: (1966–1970)
Splügen Venezia (1970–1973)
Canon Venezia: (1973–1980)
Carrera Venezia: (1980–1984)
Giomo Venezia: (1984–1987)
Hitachi Venezia: (1987–1990)
Scaini Venezia: (1991–1993)
Acqua Lora Venezia: (1993–1994)
San Benedetto: (1994–1995) 
Reyer Venezia: (1995-1996)
Panto Venezia: (1998–2001)
Acqua Pia Antica Marcia: (2005–2006)
Umana Reyer Venezia: (2006–present)

References

External links 
Official site 
Serie A profile 

1872 establishments in Italy
Basketball teams established in 1925
Basketball teams in Veneto
Sports clubs established in 1872
Sport in Venice